Where Did You Get That Girl? is a 1941 American comedy film directed by Arthur Lubin and starring Leon Errol. The title comes from the popular song of the same name, which dates to 1913 and was written by Bert Kalmar and Harry Puck. The song figures prominently in the film.

The plot of the film is about the misadventures of a swing band trying to break into the big time. Helen Parrish plays the band's vocalist.

Plot
Poverty stricken musicians borrow instruments from a pawn shop one night and form a band.

Cast
 Leon Errol as MacDevin
 Helen Parrish as Helen Borden
 Charles Lang as Jeff
 Eddie Quillan as Joe
 Franklin Pangborn as Digby 
Stanley Fields as Crandall
Tom Dugan as Murphy
Joe Brown Jr. as Davey
Leonard Sues as Franky
Kenneth Lundy as Shrimp
Joe Cobb as Tubby

Production
The film was based on an original story by Jay Dratler. In August 1940 Universal reported that Stanley Rubin and Hal Brock were writing the script. By October Helen Parrish and Charles Lang were set as lead actors. Filming started 30 October.

Reception
The Los Angeles Times called it "a diverting little musical seemingly just missing the hilarious note evidently aimed at."

Diabolique magazine called it "a joyous, breezy, silly musical made with predominantly young talent; you can feel Lubin being in complete charge of the material and having a ball."

References

External links
Where Did You Get That Girl? at IMDb
Where Did You Get That Girl? at TCMDB

1941 films
American comedy films
1941 comedy films
Films directed by Arthur Lubin
American black-and-white films
1940s English-language films
1940s American films